Ptahmose was High Priest of Ptah in Memphis during the time of Thutmose IV. Ptahmose held the titles of High Priest of Ptah in the two houses (pr.wy), he who is over the secrets of the great [..] and of foremost position in Rostau.

References

Memphis High Priests of Ptah
Priests of the Eighteenth Dynasty of Egypt
14th-century BC clergy
14th-century BC Egyptian people